Spring Hill is a city in Maury and Williamson counties, Tennessee, located approximately  south of Nashville. Spring Hill's population as of 2020 was 50,005. Spring Hill is recognized as the 4th fastest growing city in Tennessee by the U.S. Census Bureau and is included in the Nashville metropolitan area.

History
The first settlers of Spring Hill arrived in 1808 and the city was established in 1809. Albert Russell was the first person to build a home on the land that became Spring Hill.

Spring Hill was the site of a Civil War battle, now known as the Battle of Spring Hill, on November 29, 1864.

Later, Spring Hill was the home of a preparatory school, Branham and Hughes Military Academy, the campus of which now serves as the main campus of Tennessee Children's Home, a ministry associated with the Churches of Christ.

On January 10, 1963, an F3 tornado tore through the center of the town, damaging many buildings and causing $500,000 in damage.

Recent growth
As the Nashville metro area continues to grow, Spring Hill has seen rapid growth in recent years with a population of 23,462 in 2007, a 2010 census population of 29,036 and a population of 31,140 in 2012. In 2018, Spring Hill officially hit 40,000 residents.

In November, 2015, the Spring Hill Board of Mayor and Aldermen approved the ‘Spring Hill Rising: 2040’ comprehensive plan. The plan outlines the city's long-term development vision and ways to accomplish that vision. In 2016, the city hired Chicago-based planning and zoning consultant, Camiros Ltd, to oversee the creation of a new zoning code to implement the vision described in ‘Spring Hill Rising: 2040’.

On December 4, 2017, entities building a Chick-fil-A tore down a grain silo. A memorial plaque to the silo opened in 2018. The silo had no major recorded history but was perceived by the town community as a landmark that signaled the beginning of the town. The idea of the memorial was originally posited as a joke but became serious.

Geography
Spring Hill is located at  (35.752556, -86.914021).

According to the United States Census Bureau, the city has a total area of 29.14 square miles (75.47 km2), of which 29.09 square miles (75.35 km2) is land and 0.05 square mile (0.12 km2) (0.17%) is water.

Demographics

2020 census

As of the 2020 United States census, there were 50,005 people, 12,727 households, and 10,582 families residing in the city.

2010 census
As of the 2010 United States Census, there were 29,036 people, 9,861 households, and 7,884 families living in the city. The population density was 1,640.45 persons per square mile and the housing unit density was 557.12 units per square mile. The racial makeup of the city was 89.14% White, 5.39% Black or African American, 1.64% Asian, 0.24% Native American, 0.17% Pacific Islander, 1.53% from other races, and 1.90% from two or more races. Those of Hispanic or Latino origins were 5.65% of the population.

Of the 9,861 households, 50.34% had children under the age of 18 living in them, 67.26% were married couples living together, 2.80% had a male householder with no wife present, 9.89% had a female householder with no husband present, and 20.05% were non-families. 16.49% of all households were made up of individuals, and 3.26% had someone living alone who was 65 years of age or older. The average household size was 2.94 and the average family size was 3.33.

Of the 29,036 residents, 33.89% were under the age of 18, 61.08% were between the ages of 18 and 64, and 5.02% were 65 years of age or older. The median age was 31.9 years. 51.46% of the residents were female, and 48.54% were male.

The median household income in the city was $72,744 and the median family income was $78,125. Males had a median income of $54,905 versus $42,216 for females. The per capita income for the city was $27,709. About 2.8% of families and 3.6% of the population were below the poverty line, including 4.4% of those under the age of 18 and 2.9% of those age 65 and over.

2000 census
As of the 2000 census, there were 7,715 people, 2,634 households and 2,159 families living in the city. The population density was 435.6 people per square mile (168.2/km2). There were 2,819 housing units at an average density of 159.2 per square mile (61.5/km2). The racial makeup of the city was 88.33% White, 7.80% African American, 0.32% Native American, 0.49% Asian, 0.06% Pacific Islander, 1.81% from other races and 1.17% from two or more races. Hispanic or Latino of any race were 3.98% of the population.

There were 2,634 households, out of which 50.3% had children under the age of 18 living with them, 72.3% were married couples living together, 6.9% had a female householder with no husband present and 18.0% were non-families. 14.7% of all households were made up of individuals, and 2.8% had someone living alone who was 65 years of age or older. The average household size was 2.90 and the average family size was 3.24.

In the city, the population was spread out, with 32.8% under the age of 18, 6.4% from 18 to 24, 42.0% from 25 to 44, 15.2% from 45 to 64 and 3.6% who were 65 years of age or older. The median age was 30 years. For every 100 females, there were 100.2 males. For every 100 females age 18 and over, there were 98.4 males.

The median income for a household in the city was $60,872 and the median income for a family was $62,643. Males had a median income of $50,819 versus $29,821 for females. The per capita income for the city was $21,688. About 3.1% of families and 4.0% of the population were below the poverty line, including 5.0% of those under age 18 and 8.3% of those age 65 or over.

Economy
Spring Hill was the site of the Saturn Corporation production facility, which operated from 1990 to 2007. The Saturn S-Series, Saturn ION, and Saturn VUE were produced there. In 2007, General Motors Corporation (GM), the parent company of Saturn, shut down the facility to retool it for production of other GM vehicles and renamed it Spring Hill Manufacturing. The plant reopened in February 2008 and became the assembly point for the new Chevrolet Traverse. However, after a battle among plants in Spring Hill, Orion Township, Michigan and Janesville, Wisconsin, GM announced on June 26, 2009 that they had chosen to build a new small car in Orion Township.  Nearly 2,500 Spring Hill auto workers were faced with lay-off, buy-out and early retirement. The vehicle assembly part of the Spring Hill plant was idled in late 2009 when production of the Traverse was moved to Lansing, Michigan, while production of power trains and metal stamping continued. In November 2011, GM announced plans for retooling of the vehicle assembly portion of the plant for use as an "ultra-flexible" plant which will initially be used to build the Chevy Equinox and GMC Terrain but will be designed for rapid retooling to other vehicles of similar size. In April of 2021 General Motors  and South Korean joint-venture partner LG Energy Solution said they will build a second U.S. battery cell manufacturing plant, revealing plans for a $2.3 billion factory in Spring Hill, Tennessee.

Spring Hill has gone through rapid development and growth in recent years, causing General Motors to reopen their auto plant and begin hiring locally again, which will hire 1,000 new people. In addition, companies such as Ryder and Goodwill have announced new facilities in the Spring Hill area.

Government
Spring Hill is run by a mayor elected at-large and a board of eight alderman.

Education
The city is served by both Maury County Public Schools and the Williamson County School District, depending on which county one is located in.

 Maury County district schools
 Spring Hill High School (adjacent to the city limits)
 Spring Hill Middle School
 Battle Creek Middle School (adjacent to the city limits)
 Spring Hill Elementary School
 Marvin Wright Elementary School
 Battle Creek Elementary School (adjacent to the city limits)

 Williamson County district schools
 Summit High School
 Spring Station Middle School
 Heritage Middle School (in Thompson's Station)
 Allendale Elementary School
 Chapmans Retreat Elementary School
 Longview Elementary School
 Heritage Elementary School (in Thompson's Station)

 Private schools
 Columbia Academy
 Spring Hill Academy
 Zion Christian Academy

Infrastructure
Interstate 65 passes through the eastern part of the city, but the only exit currently within city limits is State Route 396. An interchange on the north side of the city at June Lake Boulevard is scheduled to open in June 2023. State Route 396, known locally as Saturn Parkway, provides an east-west freeway connection into the city with two exits before terminating at Beechcroft Road near the GM plant. U.S. Route 31 is the main north-south arterial through Spring Hill. It is alternatively called both Columbia Pike on the south side of town and Nashville Highway on the north side. State Route 247 is a major east-west road through the city.

Arts and culture
Rippavilla Plantation, which is located at 5700 Main Street (US 31, Nashville Highway), offers educational activities and an annual corn maze among other attractions. The historic Battle of Spring Hill site is located off Kedron Road and is open for self-guided tours year round.

Notable residents 

 Julie Hayden, a 17-year old teacher murdered by the White Man's League in 1874 in Hartsville.

 Sterling Marlin, NASCAR driver and Two Time Daytona 500 Winner

 Chris Moneymaker, Professional Poker Player and winner of the Main Event at the 2003 WSOP

References

External links

 City of Spring Hill Official Website
 The Battle of Spring Hill, Tennessee by John K. Shellenberger

Cities in Maury County, Tennessee
Cities in Williamson County, Tennessee
Cities in Tennessee
Populated places established in 1808
1808 establishments in Tennessee
Cities in Nashville metropolitan area